Bitschwiller-lès-Thann (literally Bitschwiller near Thann) is a commune in the Haut-Rhin department in Grand Est in north-eastern France.

The town lies in the Thur River Valley near the Vosges mountains.

History
The town is first mentioned about 1250.  Before the early 1900s the town was known only as Bitschwiller.  It was destroyed by Norman mercenaries during the Hundred Years' War. By 1624 about 100 people lived in this village.

Immigrants from Germany and Switzerland arrived during the 1650s. The entire Alsace region was fought over many times between the French and Germans. Germany ruled this area (including Bitschwiller) in 1874-1918 and again 1940-1945.

This was and continues to be an industrialised area.  Iron mining began in the 1470s but only for a short while.  Mining returned in 1735 and a metalworks was built.  A foundry opened in 1739.  A weaving factory opened in 1826.  As the industrialization continued, steam engines and locomotives were built beginning in 1836, although rail lines did not yet come to Bitschwiller and the locomotives were transported from Bitschwiller by oxen.

The Dampf Pfifla (or Steam Whistle) was invented there about 1836.

On 25 October 1838 the first locomotive ever built by French engineers was tried on the St. Cloud and Paris Railway.  Its name was the Alsace.  The locomotive was a success, attaining a speed of about 33 miles per hour.  It was built at the manufacturing plant of Messrs. Stehelin and Huber, in Bitschwiller.  The firm was large enough to supply locomotives at a rate of 12 per year at that time.

The Catholic Church named St. Alphonse is in Bitschwiller, whose famous Callinet organ dates back to 1838.  Alsace has over 1350 organs and has been called the world capital of the organ.

The peak of population was 3,379 people in 1856.

Smaller surrounding villages include Erzenbach, Busenbach and Wickenbaechle.

Emigration began about 1845-1846 and continued for over 20 years.  Currently the village population is about 2,000 people.

Geography
The elevation near the town center is about 357m but rises quickly to as high as 920m within .  The town lies roughly north-northhwest to south-southeast along the Thur River with the main road leading through town this way.  The surrounding hillsides are forested.

Climate
Bitschwiller-lès-Thann has a oceanic climate (Köppen climate classification Cfb).

Population

Family names from and around Bitschwiller-lès-Thann
Bogenstahl, Freyburger, Gasser, Grunenwald, Gstalter, Haller, Kutter, Khlogner, Mandleur, Munsch, Naegelin, Nusbaum, Olanie, Olanier, Rebischung, Scherrer, Schilling, Schmidt, Schen, Storcklin, Tschaen, Welckle, Weishart, Wogenstahl.

See also
 Communes of the Haut-Rhin department

References

External links

  Robert Behra's Communities of Alsace website

Communes of Haut-Rhin